Svecia (or Sveciaost, ost meaning cheese) is a Swedish cheese. It is a semi-hard cow's-milk cheese, with a creamy consistency, light yellow colour, small irregular holes, and a mildly acidic taste. It is produced in wax-covered cylinders weighing  each.

The cheese is similar to other Swedish hard cheeses whose manufacturing methods date back to perhaps the 13th century, but the name Svecia  — from the Latin Suecia meaning "Sweden" — is a 20th-century invention, dating to 1920.

Svecia is produced in a fashion typical to many semi-hard cheeses. Rennet is added to coagulate the milk into curds and lactic acid enzymes are added to replace enzymes and bacteria killed during pasteurization. The curd is cut, stirred, and slowly drained, then heated back up to a temperature near  to drive off more moisture. After salt is added, the curds are packed into moulds, loosely enough to leave the air pockets which make up Svecia's tiny holes. After a soak in brine, bringing the total salt content of the cheese to 1.0–1.5 percent by weight, the cheese is aged in a dry environment for at least two months — sometimes up to more than a year.

References

Swedish cheeses
Swedish products with protected designation of origin
Cheeses with designation of origin protected in the European Union
Cow's-milk cheeses
Grainy cheeses